The Mask Thai Descendant was the tenth season of The Mask Singer, a Thai singing competition program presented by Kan Kantathavorn. The program aired on Workpoint TV on Thursday at 20:05 from 28 May 2020 to 3 September 2020.

The tournament format was similar to that of The Mask Line Thai and The Mask Thai Literature. But the difference was that this season was combined with Thai heritage, wisdom, culture and tradition.

Panel of Judges

First round

Mai Ek

Mai Tho

Mai Tri

Semi-final

Mai Ek

Mai Tho

Mai Tri

Final

Champ VS Champ

Champ of the Champ

Elimination table

References 

The Mask Singer (Thai TV series)
2020 Thai television seasons